Jowkar-e Shafi (also Romanized as Jowkār-e Shafīʿ) is a village in Gughar Rural District, in the Central District of Baft County, Kerman Province, Iran. At the 2006 census, its population was 16, in 4 families.

References 

Populated places in Baft County